The Aswa-Lolim Game Reserve was a wildlife reserve in northern Uganda. It was degazetted in 1972.

The reserve was located just north of Murchison Falls National Park and provided a dispersal and migration area for ungulates including elephants.

In 2010 the Uganda Wildlife Authority gave a concession to a private group known as the Aswa-Lolim Wildlife Association to manage the important wildlife migration route in the area.

References

Wildlife sanctuaries of Uganda
1972 disestablishments